Haruo Nakano (born 20 February 1965) is a Japanese former professional tennis player.

Nagano appeared in a single Davis Cup tie for Japan, against South Korea at home in Hasaki, Ibaraki in 1989. He was victorious in the doubles, partnering Shigeru Ota, but lost both of his singles matches, which included the tie deciding fifth rubber to Song Dong-wook.

Since his retirement he served for period of time as coach of Kimiko Date.

See also
List of Japan Davis Cup team representatives

References

External links
 
 
 

1965 births
Living people
Japanese male tennis players
20th-century Japanese people